Thomas Edward Price (born July 12, 1954) is a Canadian former ice hockey defenseman who played 29 games in the National Hockey League.

Early life 
Price was born in Toronto. As a youth, he played in the 1967 Quebec International Pee-Wee Hockey Tournament with a minor ice hockey team from Toronto Township.

Career 
During his career, Price was a member of the California Golden Seals, the Cleveland Barons and the Pittsburgh Penguins between 1974 and 1979. The rest of his career, which lasted from 1974 to 1986, was mainly spent in the minor leagues.

Career statistics

References

External links
 

1954 births
Living people
Binghamton Dusters players
California Golden Seals draft picks
California Golden Seals players
Canadian expatriate ice hockey players in the United States
Canadian ice hockey defencemen
Cleveland Barons (NHL) players
Grand Rapids Owls players
Indianapolis Racers draft picks
London Knights players
New Haven Nighthawks players
Ottawa 67's players
Pittsburgh Penguins players
Saginaw Gears players
Salt Lake Golden Eagles (CHL) players
Ice hockey people from Toronto
Springfield Indians players
Syracuse Firebirds players